Mireille Derebona (born 19 May 1990) is a Central African middle distance runner who specializes in the 800 metres.

She competed at the 2007 World Championships, but was knocked out in the first round. At the 2008 Olympic Games she was the flag bearer at the opening ceremony. She competed in heat six of the 800 metres, but was disqualified.

Her personal best time is 2:22.0 minutes, achieved in June 2006 in Garoua.

References

External links
 

1990 births
Living people
Central African Republic female middle-distance runners
Athletes (track and field) at the 2008 Summer Olympics
Olympic athletes of the Central African Republic
World Athletics Championships athletes for the Central African Republic